Orienteering Queensland is the state-level body promoting orienteering in the state of Queensland, Australia.

External links 

 Orienteering Queensland

Orienteering in Australia
Sports governing bodies in Queensland